Lucas J. Butkus (born June 26, 1979) is an American football coach and former center who is the offensive line coach for the Green Bay Packers of the National Football League (NFL). He previously served as an assistant coach for the University of Illinois, Jacksonville Jaguars, Seattle Seahawks and the University of Oregon.

Butkus played college football at the University of Illinois and was signed by the Chicago Bears as an undrafted free agent in 2002. He has also played for the Rhein Fire, San Diego Chargers and Cologne Centurions.

Playing career
He attended training camp with the Bears in 2002 and the San Diego Chargers in 2003. Butkus also played center for the Rhein Fire (2003) and Cologne Centurions (2004) of NFL Europe. He attended Bloom Trail High School in Chicago Heights, Illinois and the University of Illinois.

Coaching career

Oregon
In 2005, Butkus began his coaching career at the University of Oregon as a graduate assistant coach. He would serve in this position until 2006.

Chicago Bears
In 2007, Butkus was hired by the Chicago Bears as an offensive assistant and assistant offensive line coach under head coach Lovie Smith. 

While the announcement that the tenure of quality control coaches Butkus and Charles London would end came on the same day as the public learned that several Bears' offensive coaches would be fired, leading to speculation that London and Butkus were fired for performance issues, the team would later clarify that the quality control coaches were signed to contracts set to expire after the 2009/10 season, regardless of the team's final standing.

Seattle Seahawks
On February 1, 2010, Butkus was hired by the Seattle Seahawks as their assistant offensive line coach under head coach Pete Carroll.

Illinois
In 2012, joined his alma mater, the University of Illinois under head coach Tim Beckman.

Jacksonville Jaguars
In 2013, Butkus was hired by the Jacksonville Jaguars as their assistant offensive line coach under head coach Gus Bradley.

Illinois (second stint)
In 2016, Butkus returned to the University of Illinois as their offensive line coach, reuniting with head coach Lovie Smith.

Green Bay Packers
On February 7, 2019, Butkus was hired by the Green Bay Packers as their assistant offensive line coach under head coach Matt LaFleur.

On January 30, 2022, Butkus was promoted to offensive line coach following Adam Stenavich's promotion to offensive coordinator.

Personal life
Butkus is the nephew of Pro Football Hall of Fame linebacker Dick Butkus.

References

External links
 Green Bay Packers bio
Seattle Seahawks profile

1979 births
Living people
American football centers
American people of Lithuanian descent
Chicago Bears coaches
Chicago Bears players
Cologne Centurions (NFL Europe) players
Green Bay Packers coaches
Illinois Fighting Illini football coaches
Illinois Fighting Illini football players
Jacksonville Jaguars coaches
Oregon Ducks football coaches
People from Steger, Illinois
Rhein Fire players
San Diego Chargers players
Seattle Seahawks coaches
Sportspeople from Cook County, Illinois